Lorena Gale (May 9, 1958 – June 21, 2009) was a Canadian actress, playwright and theatre director. She was active onstage and in films and television since the 1980s. She also authored two award-winning plays, Angélique and Je me souviens.

Life and career
Gale was born in Montreal, Quebec. She studied at Concordia University and the National Theatre School and completed a Master of Arts in Liberal Studies from Simon Fraser University in Vancouver in 2005.

Her performances on stage for Lorraine Hansberry's Raisin in the Sun and Joseph A. Walker's River Niger won her the Montreal Gazette Theatre Critics Award for Outstanding Performance in 1981.

In 1985 she became the artistic director of Montréal's Black Theatre Workshop. She then studied playwriting at the Playwrights' Workshop Montréal.

After moving to Vancouver in 1988,  Lorena won a 1991 Jessie Richardson Award for best supporting actress as Normal Jean in The Colored Museum (1990) .

Her play, Angélique, the story of executed slave Marie-Joseph Angelique, was the winner of the 1995 duMaurier National Playwriting Competition in Canada.  Her writing explores the nature of being black and mixed race and belonging in Canada. In 2000, she produced her play Je me souviens, a monologue about her experiences growing up in Montreal, at the Firehall Arts Centre in Vancouver, BC. The play was published by Talonbooks in 2001.

She appeared in such movies as The Hotel New Hampshire, Another Cinderella Story, Ernest Goes to School, Fantastic Four, Traitor, The Chronicles of Riddick, The Mermaid Chair, and The Exorcism of Emily Rose. She has guest starred on programs such as The X-Files, Stargate SG-1, Smallville and Kingdom Hospital. Until August 2005, she starred as Priestess Elosha on the SciFi Channel television program Battlestar Galactica.

Gale also lent her voice to several animated works such as RoboCop: Alpha Commando, The Bitsy Bears, Camp Candy, The Adventures of Corduroy and Hurricanes.

Gale's final film role was as a librarian in Scooby-Doo! The Mystery Begins, which was dedicated to her.

Death
Gale died following a battle with throat cancer on June 21, 2009 at age 51. Her body was cremated.

Filmography

References

External links

Podcast conversation with Lorena Gale on Sci-Fi Talk (about 24 minutes in length; Gale talked about her recent roles)
Lorena Gale, Angélique (1999) (from the Way Back Machine, June 30, 2007)

 Lorena Gale article at Canadian Theatre Encyclopedia

1958 births
2009 deaths
20th-century Canadian dramatists and playwrights
Actresses from Montreal
Anglophone Quebec people
Black Canadian actresses
Deaths from cancer in British Columbia
Canadian women dramatists and playwrights
Canadian film actresses
Canadian television actresses
Canadian theatre directors
Canadian voice actresses
Writers from Montreal
20th-century Canadian women writers
Concordia University alumni
Simon Fraser University alumni
National Theatre School of Canada alumni
Black Canadian writers
Canadian artistic directors
Deaths from throat cancer